Send Away the Tigers is the eighth studio album by Welsh alternative rock band Manic Street Preachers, released on 7 May 2007 by record label Columbia. It reached number 2 on the UK Albums Chart.

Background 

The album is named after a phrase the English comedian Tony Hancock used to refer to "battling one's inner demons by getting drunk". The album is widely seen as a return to the hard-edged, more guitar-driven sound of their earlier releases, being described as a hard rock album by AllMusic and Sputnikmusic, as well as glam rock by Uncut and Reno Gazette-Journal. The band itself has described it as a mixture of Generation Terrorists and Everything Must Go. The album was mixed by Chris Lord-Alge, whose brother Tom provided the US mix of The Holy Bible.

The album sleeve features a quotation from Wyndham Lewis (there misspelled as "Wyndam Lewis"): "When a man is young, he is usually a revolutionary of some kind. So here I am, speaking of my revolution". "I'm Just a Patsy" is a direct quotation from Lee Harvey Oswald denying the murder of U.S. President John F. Kennedy.

Nina Persson from the Cardigans shares vocals on "Your Love Alone Is Not Enough", the first single from the album. The song "Rendition" concerns the act of extraordinary rendition, which has been described as a global system of human rights violations. The song is partly inspired by the Academy Award-winning 1982 film Missing starring Jack Lemmon.

The photographs used as the album artwork are taken from the book Monika Monster Future First Woman on Mars by Valerie Phillips. The models are a Polish-American college student called Monika Monster and her cousin Kate.

In September 2008 the band embedded three songs on their website, named "Donkeys (Acoustic)", "Untitled Instrumental" and "Motown Junk (The Johnny Boy Anniversary Mix)". They were replaced by songs from their next album in April 2009.

Release 

The song "Underdogs" was made available as a free download and limited edition one sided 7" single on 19 March 2007 as a 'thank you' to the fans who have supported the Manics over the years. The song received its premiere on the Phill Jupitus show on BBC 6 Music on Saint David's Day (1 March 2007).

The album was released on 7 May 2007, and it entered and peaked the UK Album Chart at number 2, it sold 38,769 copies in the first week, the album was BPI certified as achieving Gold status (100,000 copies) during week 30 of 2007. In Ireland the album peaked at number 4, being certified Gold in that region as well. It reached the Top 10 in Finland and as for Europe, the album peaked at number 9 in the European charts.

The preceding single of the album "Your Love Alone Is Not Enough" featured Nina Persson from the Cardigans and debuted at No. 26 in the UK Singles Chart, reaching its peak on the second week, where it reached No. 2. "Autumnsong" was the second single and it managed to peak at No. 10, on the other end, the last single from the album, "Indian Summer", peaked at No. 22, making it the first Manics single not to chart in the Top 20 since 1994's "She Is Suffering".

The band released a special edition of the record on 12 May 2017. The special edition featured a remastered album as well as b-sides and rarities spread over two discs, plus a DVD which features the band's 2007 Glastonbury performance, rehearsal footage, an album track-by-track, and promo videos. This edition also replaced the second track, "Underdogs", with the former B-side "Welcome To The Dead Zone".

Reception 

Considered a return to form for Manic Street Preachers, Send Away the Tigers was released to generally positive reviews from critics. At Metacritic, which assigns a normalized rating to reviews from mainstream critics, the album has received an average score of 69 out of 100, which indicates "generally favourable reviews," based on 13 reviews.

Q Magazine awarded the album four stars out of five, describing Send Away the Tigers as a "back-to-basics" rock record and calling it "overdue": "Send Away the Tigers refocuses the trio, allowing them to relocate their original plot and make a big rock classic." The publication cited the single "Autumnsong" as its highlight. NME gave the album eight out of ten, calling it the band's best release since 1996's Everything Must Go, and the "cathartic regeneration that the band really needed in order to become relevant again." Talia Kraines, writing for BBC Online, agreed and called Send Away the Tigers a "brilliant pop record."

Among less positive commentaries, The Guardian and The Observer both awarded the album three stars, with the latter describing Send Away the Tigers as a "pedestrian retread of former glories." Alex Denney went further in a negative review for Drowned in Sound, describing the album as a "bloated swansong" that was "embarrassing" in parts, with the band "going through the motions". AllMusic disagreed, with Stephen Thomas Erlewine describing its relatively short and concise length as a "welcome progression from a band that only a couple of albums back seemed stuck in a rut with no way out."

Accolades 

Retrospectively, NME cited the record as when the band "rediscovered their sense of purpose and ushered in their third great phase" with the critically acclaimed Journal for Plague Lovers and  Postcards from a Young Man following. Bassist Nicky Wire remains fond of the album, saying of the pre-Send Away the Tigers period: "It didn't feel like we were a band just before that. We were on the verge of nothingness and to dig that out of ourselves made us fall in love with music again."

The album helped earn the band the following accolades from critics:
 NME "Godlike Genius Award" in the 2008 Shockwaves NME Awards.
 The album was placed at No. 16 in Q Magazine's 50 Best Albums of 2007.
 Uncut made Send Away the Tigers the 43rd best album of 2007.

The record was also re-evaluated by Drowned in Sound in 2008, with Ben Patashnik describing Send Away the Tigers as "far better than anyone had any right to hope for, it sees the Manics embracing their stadium status by writing a collection of dynamic, catchy rock songs that seemed tailor-made for summer festivals. It blows the previous two albums out of the water, not simply because they sound like they’re having fun again, but because they’re not trying to ignore their past."

Track listing 

 10th Anniversary Edition DVD (Live at Glastonbury 2007 and extras)

 "You Love Us"
 "Motorcycle Emptiness"
 "You Stole The Sun From My Heart" 
 "Faster" 
 "Your Love Alone Is Not Enough" 
 "Everything Must Go"
 "From Despair To Where" 
 "Autumnsong" 
 "Ocean Spray" 
 "If You Tolerate This Your Children Will Be Next" 
 "La Tristesse Durera (Scream to a Sigh)" 
 "Imperial Bodybags" 
 "Motown Junk"
 "A Design For Life"
 Your Love Alone Is Not Enough Video
 Making of Your Love Alone Is Not Enough
 Autumnsong Video
 Autumnsong Alternative Video
 Indian Summer Video
 Track By Track
 Rehearsals, Cardiff, March 2007
 Practice Sessions

Personnel 

 Manic Street Preachers

 James Dean Bradfield – lead vocals, lead and rhythm guitar, backing vocals
 Sean Moore – drums, percussion
 Nicky Wire – bass guitar, occasional vocals

 Additional personnel

 Nina Persson – second lead vocals on "Your Love Alone Is Not Enough"
 Sean Read – keyboards on "The Second Great Depression" and "Indian Summer"
 Sally Herbert – violin and string arrangement on "Autumnsong" and "Indian Summer"
 Andrew Waters – first violin and string arrangements on "The Second Great Depression"
 Sonia Slany - violin on "Autumnsong" and "Indian Summer"
 Lucy Morgan – viola on "Autumnsong" and "Indian Summer"
 Howard Scott – violin on "Autumnsong" and "Indian Summer"
 Morgan Goff – viola on "Autumnsong" and "Indian Summer"
 Ian Burdge – cello on "Autumnsong" and "Indian Summer"

Charts and certifications

European Charts 

 Certifications

References

External links
 

Send Away the Tigers at YouTube (streamed copy where licensed)

2007 albums
Manic Street Preachers albums
Columbia Records albums
Albums produced by Dave Eringa
Albums produced by Loz Williams
Albums produced by Greg Haver